= List of Whitby Town F.C. seasons =

Whitby Town F.C. was founded as Streaneshalch Football Club in October 1880, soon after its foundation the club changed its name to Whitby Church Temperance. The name was changed in late 1882 to Whitby Football Club and continued to play friendly games as well as competing in the Scarborough & East Riding County Cup. Whitby joined the Northern League for the first time in 1893 only to return to the Cleveland Amateur League two seasons later. They returned to the Northern League in 1899.

== Key ==
Key to league record

- Lvl = Level of the league in the current league system
- S = Numbers of seasons
- Pld = Games played
- W = Games won
- D = Games drawn
- L = Games lost
- GF = Goals for
- GA = Goals against
- GD = Goals difference
- Pts = Points
- Position = Position in the final league table
- Overall position = Overall club position in the English league system

Key to cup records

- Res = Final reached round
- Rec = Final club record in the form of wins-draws-losses
- EP= Extra Preliminary round
- PR = Premilinary round
- QR1 = Qualifying round 1
- QR2 = Qualifying round 2
- QR3 = Qualifying round 3
- QR4 = Qualifying round 4
- R1 = Round 1
- R2 = Round 2
- R3 = Round 3
- R4 = Round 4
- R5 = Round 5
- R6 = Round 6
- QF = Quarter-finals
- SF = Semi-finals
- RU = Runners-up
- W = Winners

== Seasons ==
In the non-league system where there is promotion and relegation there is the necessity for those in charge of scheduling matches to move some teams between different regional leagues at the same level to ensure as even a geographical spread as possible.

=== Timeline notes ===
Despite being promoted to Division 1 of the Northern League in 1900, the league season following only had one division due to the number of teams that left at the end of the previous season.
At the end of the 1901 season, the club left the Northern League.
When the club returned to the Northern League in 1926, they were known as Whitby United having merged with Whitby Whitehall Swifts. They would compete as United until 1949.
Even though the club did not compete in the Northern League in 1945–46 season, they were non-playing members and were eligible for the FA Cup that season. They lost in the second qualifying round at Stockton 0–4.
During the 1960–61 season, the club were deducted points for fielding an ineligible player.
The 1964-65 FA Amateur Cup semi-final against Enfield was played at Sunderland.
During the 1966–67 season the club were deducted two points.
During the 1972–73 season the club were deducted two points.
In the 1974–75 season, 3 points for a win was introduced by the Northern League.
During the 1975–76 season the club were deducted two points.
During the 1978–79 season the club were deducted three points.
During the 1978–79 season the club were deducted three points.
At the end of the 1981–82 season the league was expanded to two divisions.
During the 1989–90 season the club were deducted three points.
The 1996-97 FA Cup 1st round home tie against Hull was actually played in Scarborough.
The 1997-98 FA Vase 1st qualifying round replay was a 3–3 draw in regulation time. Whitby won the penalty shootout 4–3.
The 1998-99 FA Cup 3rd qualifying round replay against Bedlington Terriers was a 1–1 draw in regulation time. Whitby lost the penalty shootout 4–3.
The 1999-00 FA Cup 3rd qualifying round replay against Lancaster City was a 2–2 draw in regulation time. Whitby lost the penalty shootout 4–2.
The 2000-01 FA Vase 1 qualifying round replay against Bishop Auckland was a 2–2 draw in regulation time. Whitby lost the penalty shootout 5–4.
At the end of the 2003–04 season the club qualified for the league play-offs but were defeated in their only match by Radcliffe Borough 8–7 on penalties after the match had finished 2–2 in regulation time.
The 2005-06 1st qualifying round tie away at Newcastle Blue Star was switched to Whitby.
The 2020―21 FA Cup 1st Qualifying round tie against Warrington Rylands ended 1–1 after regulation time, but Whitby lost the penalty shootout 4–3

During the 2023-24 season the club were docked three points for fielding an ineligible player.

Year	League	Lvl	Pld	W	D	L	GF	GA	GD	Pts	Position	Leading league scorer		FA Cup		FA Trophy		FA Vase		FA Amateur Cup	
Year	League	Lvl	Pld	W	D	L	GF	GA	GD	Pts	Position	Name	Goals	Res	Rec	Res	Rec	Res	Rec	Res	Rec
1893–94	Northern League	N/A	14	5	2	7	45	43	+2	12	6th of 8										
1894–95	Northern League	N/A	18	8	2	8	43	45	-2	18	5th of 10										
1895–96	Northern League	N/A	16	6	3	7	23	38	-15	15	6th of 9										
1896–97	Cleveland Amateur League	N/A	No records found to date																		
1897–98	Cleveland Amateur League	N/A	No records found to date																		
1898–99	Cleveland Amateur League	N/A	No records found to date																		
1899–1900	Northern League Division 2	N/A	14	9	3	2	49	23	+26	21	1st of 8 Champions & Promoted										
1900–01	Northern League	N/A	20	2	4	14	17	65	-48	8	11th of 11; No relegation possible										
1901–26	The club reverted to paying only friendlies until after World War I when it played in the Scarborough & District League for which no records have been found to date.																				
1926–27	Northern League	N/A	26	13	2	11	69	57	+12	28	7th of 14			3Q	0–1–1						
1927–28	Northern League	N/A	24	14	4	6	63	58	+5	32	2nd of 13										
1928–29	Northern League	N/A	24	14	4	6	72	47	+25	32	3rd of 13										
1929–30	Northern League	N/A	24	10	5	9	69	76	-7	25	6th of 13			3Q	0–0–1						
1930–31	Northern League	N/A	24	8	6	10	56	53	+3	22	8th of 13			4Q	1–1–1						
1931–32	Northern League	N/A	26	12	3	11	67	66	+1	27	8th of 14										
1932–33	Northern League	N/A	26	9	6	11	85	65	+20	24	8th of 14										
1933–34	Northern League	N/A	26	14	7	5	67	53	+14	35	2nd of 14										
1934–35	Northern League	N/A	26	7	5	14	52	65	-13	19	11th of 14										
1935–36`	Northern League	N/A	26	7	4	15	62	83	-21	18	12th of 14										
1936–37	Northern League	N/A	26	14	1	11	72	60	+12	29	5th of 14										
1937–38	Northern League	N/A	26	8	6	12	47	78	-31	22	9th of 14										
1938–39	Northern League	N/A	26	12	1	13	51	64	-13	25	6th of 14										
1939–46	Northern league held one season of competition in 1939–40, but Whitby had resigned from the league. They did not start competitive matches until the 1946―47 season after changing their name back to Whitby Town																				
1946–47	Northern League	N/A	26	7	4	15	46	75	-29	18	13th of 14										
1947–48	Northern League	N/A	26	8	3	15	52	76	-26	19	12th of 14										
1948–49	Northern League	N/A	26	7	3	16	39	68	-29	17	12th of 14										
1949–50	Northern League	N/A	26	16	3	7	67	42	+25	35	3rd of 14										
1950–51	Northern League	N/A	26	15	6	5	75	42	+33	36	3rd of 14			3Q	3–0–1					3R	0–0–1
1951–52	Northern League	N/A	26	12	6	8	71	49	+22	30	5th of 14			3Q	2–0–1						
1952-53	Northern League	N/A	26	15	5	6	71	45	+26	35	3rd of 14			2Q	0–0–1						
1953-54	Northern League	N/A	26	9	6	11	58	56	+2	24	7th of 14			1Q	0–0–1						
1954-55	Northern League	N/A	26	10	7	9	65	58	+7	27	7th of 14			1Q	0–0–1						
1955–56	Northern League	N/A	26	4	3	19	39	97	-58	11	14th of 14; No relegation possible			2Q	0–1–1						
1956–57	Northern League	N/A	26	5	4	17	54	84	-30	14	13th of 14			3Q	1–0–1						
1957-58	Northern League	N/A	26	7	5	14	58	69	-11	19	12th of 14			2Q	1–1–1						
1958–59	Northern League	N/A	28	13	5	10	70	61	+11	31	6th of 15			1Q	0–0–1						
1959–60	Northern League	N/A	28	10	5	13	61	62	-1	25	9th of 15			1Q	0–0–1						
1960–61	Northern League	N/A	30	7	6	17	52	84	-32	18	15th of 16			1Q	0–0–1						
1961–62	Northern League	N/A	30	9	6	15	61	87	-26	24	13th of 16			1Q	0–0–1						
1962–63	Northern League	N/A	30	12	2	16	62	65	-3	26	10th of 16			1Q	0–0–1						
1963–64	Northern League	N/A	30	13	3	14	57	52	+5	29	9th of 16			3Q	2–2–1					QF	1–0–1
1964–65	Northern League	N/A	34	19	4	11	74	52	+22	42	4th of 18									F	3–1–1
1965–66	Northern League	N/A	34	15	6	13	63	57	+6	36	7th of 18			4Q	3–1–1						
1966–67	Northern League	N/A	34	16	4	14	85	75	+10	34	10th of 18			2Q	1–1–1						
1967–68	Northern League	N/A	34	24	6	4	107	41	+66	54	2nd of 18			3Q	2–0–1						
1968–69	Northern League	N/A	34	20	5	9	71	55	+16	45	6th of 18			1Q	0–0–1					3R	1–1–1
1969–70	Northern League	N/A	34	11	10	13	45	49	-4	32	10th of 18			1R	5–0–1					2R	0–0–1
1970–71	Northern League	N/A	38	19	11	8	82	51	+31	49	4th of 20										
1971–72	Northern League	N/A	38	18	8	12	75	59	+16	44	7th of 20			2Q	1–0–1						
1972–73	Northern League	N/A	38	13	7	18	58	72	-14	31	13th of 20			PR	0–0–1						
1973–74	Northern League	N/A	38	11	9	18	52	76	-24	31	16th of 20			1Q	0–0–1						
1974–75	Northern League	N/A	36	16	8	12	60	53	+7	56	5th of 19			2Q	1–1–1	PR	0–0–1				
1975–76	Northern League	N/A	38	21	11	6	76	36	+40	72	6th of 20			2Q	1–0–1	1Q	0–0–1				
1976–77	Northern League	N/A	38	21	8	9	97	62	+35	71	3rd of 20			3Q	2–1–1	3Q	2–2–1				
1977–78	Northern League	N/A	38	22	7	9	84	61	+23	73	3rd of 20			2Q	2–0–1	2R	2–0–1				
1978–79	Northern League	N/A	38	11	12	15	55	68	-13	42	14th of 20			2Q	1–1–1	1R	0–0–1				
1979–80	Northern League	N/A	38	14	10	14	72	62	+10	52	11th of 20			3Q	3–2–1	3Q	0–0–1				
1980–81	Northern League	N/A	38	15	7	16	55	59	-4	52	11th of 20			2Q	2–1–1	3Q	2–1–1				
1981–82	Northern League	N/A	38	23	11	4	64	21	+43	80	2nd of 20			1Q	0–0–1	2Q	1–1–1				
1982–83	Northern League Division 1	N/A	36	23	9	4	80	34	+46	78	2nd of 19			PR	0–0–1	1R	0–1–1				
1983–84	Northern League Division 1	N/A	34	20	7	7	79	33	+46	67	3rd of 18			2R	5–1–1	QF	3–2–1				
1984–85	Northern League Division 1	N/A	34	17	7	10	61	44	+17	58	7th of 18			1R	5–3–1	1R	0–0–1				
1985–86	Northern League Division 1	N/A	38	12	9	17	59	74	-15	45	16th of 20			2R	2–1–1	1R	1–1–1				
1986–87	Northern League Division 1	N/A	38	13	13	12	56	63	-9	52	11th of 20			1R	1–1–1	3Q	0–1–1				
1987–88	Northern League Division 1	N/A	38	12	10	16	57	74	-17	46	13th of 20			4Q	0–0–1	1R	1–0–1				
1988–89	Northern League Division 1	N/A	38	13	9	16	56	52	+4	48	12th of 20			4Q	0–1–1	3Q	0–1–1				
1989–90	Northern League Division 1	N/A	38	15	8	15	74	73	+1	50*	12th of 20			1Q	0–0–1	2Q	1–1–1				
1990–91	Northern League Division 1	N/A	38	16	13	9	66	49	+17	61	6th of 20			1Q	1–0–1	1Q	0–0–1				
1991–92	Northern League Division 1	9	38	23	9	6	74	41	+33	78	3rd of 20			1Q	0–0–1	1R	3–0–1				
1992–93	Northern League Division 1	9	38	26	10	2	104	30	+74	88	1st of 20; Champions			2Q	2–0–1	1R	1–0–1				
1993–94	Northern League Division 1	9	38	17	14	7	90	57	+33	65	4th of 20			4Q	3–1–1	1R	0–0–1				
1994–95	Northern League Division 1	9	38	22	10	6	88	45	+43	76	3rd of 20			3Q	2–1–1	1R	1–0–1				
1995–96	Northern League Division 1	9	38	21	7	10	100	59	+41	70	5th of 20			1Q	0–0–1			2R	0–0–1		
1996–97	Northern League Division 1	9	38	32	3	3	131	37	+94	99	1st of 20; Champions & Promoted			1R	5–1–1			W	8–1–0		
1997–98	Northern Premier League Division 1	8	42	30	8	4	99	48	+51	98	1st of 22; Champions & Promoted			2Q	1–0–1	2Q	1–1–1				
1998–99	North Premier League Premier Division	7	42	17	13	12	77	62	+15	64	7th of 22			3Q	1–1–1	5R	4–1–1				
1999–2000	North Premier League Premier Division	7	44	15	13	16	66	66	0	58	12th of 23			3Q	1–1–1	3R	1–0–1				
2000–01	North Premier League Premier Division	7	44	13	11	20	60	76	-16	50	17th of 23			3Q	1–0–1	1R	0–1–1				
2001–02	North Premier League Premier Division	7	44	15	8	21	61	76	-15	53	15th of 23			1R	3–1–1	2R	1–1–1				
2002–03	North Premier League Premier Division	7	44	17	12	15	80	69	+11	63	10th of 23			2Q	0–0–1	2R	1–0–1				
2003–04	North Premier League Premier Division	7	44	14	11	19	55	70	-15	53	15th of 23			1R	3–2–1	2R	0–1–1				
2004–05	North Premier League Premier Division	7	42	23	11	8	65	49	+16	80	4th of 22			2Q	1–0–1	3R	2–2–1				
2005–06	North Premier League Premier Division	7	42	18	10	14	60	59	+1	64	6th of 22			3Q	2–1–1	2Q	1–0–1				
2006–07	North Premier League Premier Division	7	42	18	6	18	63	78	-15	60	11th of 22			1Q	0–0–1	2Q	1–0–1				
2007–08	North Premier League Premier Division	7	40	13	7	20	68	75	-7	46	12th of 21			2Q	1–0–1	1Q	0–0–1				
2008–09	North Premier League Premier Division	7	42	12	10	20	58	71	-13	46	19th of 22			2Q	1–1–1	3Q	2–0–1				
2009–10	North Premier League Premier Division	7	38	12	10	16	56	62	-6	46	14th of 20			2Q	1–0–1	2Q	1–0–1				
2010–11	North Premier League Premier Division	7	42	14	9	19	58	77	-19	51	16th of 22			1Q	0–0–1	3Q	2–1–1				
2011–12	North Premier League Premier Division	7	42	12	11	19	57	80	-23	47	17th of 22			3Q	2–0–1	1Q	0–0–1				
2012–13	North Premier League Premier Division	7	42	16	9	17	68	72	-4	57	13th of 22			3Q	2–1–1	3Q	2–0–1				
2013–14	North Premier League Premier Division	7	46	18	16	12	82	64	+18	70	9th of 24			1Q	0–1–1	1Q	0–0–1				
2014–15	North Premier League Premier Division	7	46	14	16	16	56	63	-9	58	13th of 23			1Q	0–1–1	1Q	0–0–1				
2015–16	North Premier League Premier Division	7	46	12	11	23	60	79	-19	47	19th of 24			1Q	0–1–1	2Q	1–0–1				
2016–17	North Premier League Premier Division	7	46	23	10	13	64	56	+8	79	6th of 24			2Q	1–1–1	2Q	1–0–1				
2017–18	North Premier League Premier Division	7	46	12	14	20	60	82	-22	50	21st of 24			1Q	0–0–1	1Q	0–0–1				
2018–19	North Premier League Premier Division	7	40	15	4	21	48	59	-11	49	11th of 21			1Q	0–0–1	1Q	0–0–1*				
2019–20	North Premier League Premier Division	7	31	14	8	9	54	42	+12	50	Abandoned			4Q	3–2–1	2Q	1–0–1				
2020–21	North Premier League Premier Division	7	9	4	2	3	15	14	+1	14	Abandoned			3Q	2–0–1	3Q	0–0–1				
2021-22	North Premier League Premier Division	7	42	19	9	14	57	50	+7	66	7th of 22			3Q	2–0–1	2R	2–0–1				
2022-23	North Premier League Premier Division	7	42	14	10	18	45	54	-9	52	15th of 22			2Q	1–0–1	3Q	0–0–1				
2023-24	North Premier League Premier Division	7	40	17	8	15	60	50	+10	56	12th of 22			1R	4–1–1	3Q	0–0–1				
